Investigation Agency-ICTBD is a specialized law enforcement agency of Bangladesh under the Ministry of Home Affairs responsible for investigating cases and suspects for the International Crimes Tribunal. The agency is led by Md. Abdur Rahim and M Sanaul Haque, both former Bangladesh Police officers with the rank of Inspector General of Police.

History
Investigation Agency-ICTBD was established in 2013 according to the International Crimes (Tribunals) Act of 1973. It purpose is to investigate war crimes committed during the Bangladesh Liberation war and part of the Bangladesh Genocide.

References

2013 establishments in Bangladesh
Organisations based in Dhaka
Law enforcement in Bangladesh
Government agencies of Bangladesh
Government departments of Bangladesh